Genotype to Phenotype Databases: a Holistic Approach (GEN2PHEN) is a European project aiming to develop a knowledge web portal integrating information from the genotype to the phenotype in a unifying portal: The Knowledge Centre].

Summary and Objectives
The GEN2PHEN project aims to unify human and model organism genetic variation databases towards increasingly holistic views into Genotype-To-Phenotype (G2P) data, and to link this system into other biomedical knowledge sources via genome browser functionality. The project will establish the technological building-blocks needed for the evolution of today’s diverse G2P databases into a future seamless G2P biomedical knowledge environment, by the projects end. This will consist of a European-centred but globally networked hierarchy of bioinformatics GRID-linked databases, tools and standards, all tied into the Ensembl genome browser. The project has the following specific objectives:
 To analyse the G2P field and thus determine emerging needs and practices
 To develop key standards for the G2P database field
 To create generic database components, services and integration infrastructures for the G2P database domain
 To create search modalities and data presentation solutions for G2P knowledge
 To facilitate the process of populating G2P databases
 To build a major G2P internet portal
 To deploy GEN2PHEN solutions to the community
 To address system durability and long-term financing
 To undertake a whole-system utility and validation pilot study
The GEN2PHEN Consortium members have been selected from a talented pool of European research groups and companies that are interested in the G2P database challenge. Additionally, a few non-EU participants have been included to bring extra capabilities to the initiative. The final constellation is characterised by broad and proven competence, a network of established working relationships, and high-level roles/connections within other significant projects in this domain...

Background and Concept
By providing a complete Homo sapiens ‘parts list’ (the gene sequences) and a powerful ‘toolkit’ (technologies), the Human Genome Project has revolutionised mankind’s ability to explore how genes cause disease and other phenotypes. Studies in this domain are proceeding at a rapid and ever-increasing pace, generating unprecedented amounts of raw and processed data. It is now imperative that the scientific community finds ways to effectively manage and exploit this flood of information for knowledge creation and practical benefit to society. This fundamental goal lies at the heart of the “Genotype-To-Phenotype Databases: A Holistic Solution (GEN2PHEN)” project.

Previous genetics studies have shown that inter-individual genome variation plays a major role in differential normal development and disease processes. However, the details of how these relationships work are far from clear, even in the case of most Mendelian disorders where single genetic alterations are fully penetrant (essentially causative, rather than risk modifying). Background genetic effects (modifier genes), epistasis, somatic variation, and environmental factors all complicate the situation. This is particularly the case in complex, multi-factorial disorders (e.g., cancer, heart disease, diabetes, dementia) that will affect most of us at some stage in our lifetime. Strategies do, however, now exist to study the genetics of these disorders, and such investigations are a major focus of research throughout Europe and beyond. A common thread in these studies is the need to create ever-larger datasets and integrate these more effectively.

Related Projects and Applications
 GWAS Central
 Leiden Open Variation Database
 Locus Reference Genomic (LRG)

Partners
 University of Leicester, UK
 European Molecular Biology Laboratory, Germany
 Fundació IMIM, Spain
 Leiden University Medical Center, Netherlands
 Institut National de la Santé et de la Recherche Médicale, France
 Karolinska Institutet, Sweden
 Foundation for Research and Technology – Hellas, Greece
 Commissariat à l’Energie Atomique, France
 Erasmus University Medical Center, Netherlands
 Institute for Molecular Medicine Finland, University of Helsinki, Finland
 University of Aveiro – IEETA, Portugal
 University of Western Cape, South Africa
 Council of Scientific and Industrial Research, India
 Swiss Institute of Bioinformatics, Switzerland
 University of Manchester, UK
 BioBase GmbH, Germany
 deCODE genetics ehf, Iceland
 Biocomputing Platforms Ltd Oy, Finland
 University of Patras, Greece
 University Medical Center Groningen (UMCG), Netherlands (From March 2012)
 University of Lund (ULUND), Sweden (From March 2012)
 Synapse Research Management Partners, Spain. (From March 2012)

Notes and references 

Databases in Europe
Genetics databases
Genomics
Online databases
Population genetics organizations